Lim Tong Hai (born 14 May 1969) was a centre-back for the Singapore national football team from 1989 to 1999. He held various backroom roles at former club Geylang United after retiring from his playing career until his departure in 2012.

Football career

Club career 
Lim played for Geylang International in the FAS Premier League before signing for the Singapore Lions in 1994. He formed a strong partnership with South Korean Jang Jung in the heart of defence as the Lions achieved the M-League and Malaysia Cup double in 1994. With the withdrawal of the Lions from Malaysian competitions and subsequent launch of the S.League, he signed for Tiong Bahru United in 1996. In 1998, he captained Tanjong Pagar United to a Singapore Cup and Singapore FA Cup double. He made a return to Geylang United in 2002, playing a further 2 seasons until he retired as a player in 2003.

International career 
Lim was part of the Singapore national football team at the 1993 Southeast Asian Games where Singapore won the bronze medal. In the semi-finals against Myanmar, after Singapore was 2–0 up, Lim in two attempts to clear the ball in the penalty area, scored two own goals instead, causing the match to be a draw at 2–2 in full time. The match went into extra time which was a draw again at 3–3 but Singapore lost the match in the resulting penalty shootouts 4–5.

International goals

Coaching career 
Lim retired from playing in 2003 and was appointed coach for Geylang United's Prime League team the following year. In 2006, he was promoted to caretaker coach of the first team and was likely to continue to lead the team for the 2007 S.League season as he was ready to rebuild the team after years of dismal results in the league, where Geylang United was last in the standings.

However, there was a turn of fortunes when Lim led Geylang to a much-improved 2007 season high of 4th in the S-League table. There were much changes in the Geylang United side with Kim Grant, Noh Rahman, Hassan Sunny and Lim leading the team for a better start for the 2007 S-League season.

In late 2007, he assumed the role of team manager when Slovak Jozef Herel was brought in as Geylang's coach.

Management career 
In September 2013, Lim was appointed to the Football Association of Singapore council. 

He is also the chairman of the FAS' Referees' Committee.

Post football career 
Post football, Lim became a sports and wellness senior lecturer with the Institute of Technical Education College East and also a physical education and sports science consultant with National Institute of Education.

Personal life 
Lim is married and has 2 children.

References

External links

1969 births
Association football defenders
Living people
Singaporean footballers
Singapore international footballers
Singapore Premier League players
Singaporean sportspeople of Chinese descent
Geylang International FC players
Singapore FA players
Singaporean football managers
Singapore Premier League head coaches
Jurong FC players
Tanjong Pagar United FC players
Southeast Asian Games silver medalists for Singapore
Southeast Asian Games medalists in football
Competitors at the 1993 Southeast Asian Games